Argyle Independent School District is a public school district based in Argyle, Texas (USA). The district operates one high school, Argyle High School.

Attendance area
The boundary of the school district includes the majority of Argyle and portions of Bartonville, Denton, Flower Mound, and Northlake.

Finances
As of the 2010–2011 school year, the appraised valuation of property in the district was $1,032,239,000. The maintenance tax rate was $0.104 and the bond tax rate was $0.040 per $100 of appraised valuation.

Academic achievement
In 2011, the school district was rated "recognized" by the Texas Education Agency.  Thirty-five percent of districts in Texas in 2011 received the same rating. No state accountability ratings will be given to districts in 2012. A school district in Texas can receive one of four possible rankings from the Texas Education Agency: Exemplary (the highest possible ranking), Recognized, Academically Acceptable, and Academically Unacceptable (the lowest possible ranking).

Historical district TEA accountability ratings
2011: Recognized
2010: Exemplary
2009: Recognized
2008: Academically Acceptable
2007: Academically Acceptable
2006: Academically Acceptable
2005: Recognized
2004: Academically Acceptable

Schools
In the 2022–2023 school year, the district had students in six schools. 
Regular instructional
Argyle High School (Grades 9-12)
Argyle Middle School (Grades 6-8)
Argyle Intermediate School (6th grade campus Fall 2023)
Hilltop Elementary School (Grades PreK-5)
Argyle South Elementary (Grades PreK-5)
Argyle West Elementary (Grades PreK-5)
Alternative instructional
Denton County JJAEP (Grades 6-12)

Special programs

Clubs
The school features a newspaper operated by students called The Talon.

See also

List of school districts in Texas
List of high schools in Texas

References

External links

 

School districts in Denton County, Texas